HNLMS Witte de With (F813) was a frigate of the . The ship was in service with the Royal Netherlands Navy from 1986 to 2006. The frigate was named after Dutch naval hero Witte Corneliszoon de With. The ship's radio call sign was "PAVP".

Dutch service history
HNLMS Witte de With was one of two s and was built at the KM de Schelde in Vlissingen. The keel laying took place on 15 December 1981 and the launching on 25 August 1984. The ship was put into service on 17 September 1986.

The ship participated in Operation Desert Shield/Storm from September 1990 to December 1990. and Operation Sharp Guard in July 1993

On 12 May 2006 the vessel was decommissioned and sold to the Chilean Navy.

Chilean service history

The ship was put into service on 17 July 2006 where the ship was renamed Capitán Prat using the radio call sign was "CCPT".

Notes

Jacob van Heemskerck-class frigates
Jacob van Heemskerck-class frigates of the Chilean Navy
1984 ships
Ships built in Vlissingen